The Bashford Manor Stakes is a six furlong sprint for two-year-old thoroughbred horses run each year toward the end of the Spring meet at Churchill Downs.  It is a Listed race on the dirt and currently offers a purse of $100,000, (plus $7,500 added from the Breeders' Cup program). It was named in honor of the Bashford Manor Stable owned by George J. Long and which produced several Kentucky Derby contestants plus three Derby winners: Azra (1892), Manuel (1899) and Sir Huon (1906).

History
1902 served as the first running of the Bashford Manor Stakes won by Von Rouse.  In 1911, Worth won the Bashford Manor, and the following year won the Kentucky Derby. In 1923 it was won by Black Gold, the winner of the 1924 Kentucky Derby.  Other Kentucky Derby winners who ran in the Bashford Manor include Donau, who was third in 1909, Old Rosebud who was second in 1913, Clyde Van Dusen who was unplaced in 1928, and more recently, Grindstone, who finished fourth in 1995.  All of them won the Kentucky Derby the following year.

Records
Speed record:
 0:53.00 @ 4.5 furlongs : Reputation (1924)
 0:57.80 @ 5 furlongs : Santiago Road (1968)
 1:09.15 @ 6 furlongs : Kodiak Kowboy (2007)

Most wins by a jockey:
 4 – Julio Espinoza (1979, 1980, 1990, 1991)
 4 – Pat Day (1983, 1984, 1989, 1997)

Most wins by a trainer:
 5 – D. Wayne Lukas (1992, 1996, 1998, 1999, 2000)
 5 – Steve Asmussen (2004, 2007, 2010, 2014, 2018)

Most wins by an owner:
 3 – Milky Way Farm (1936, 1937, 1941)
 3 – T. Alie Grissom (1957, 1961, 1969)
 3 – Padua Stables (1998, 1999, 2000)

Winners

References

External links
Churchill Downs website
Churchill Downs track page, NTRA

1902 establishments in Kentucky
Churchill Downs horse races
Flat horse races for two-year-olds
Recurring sporting events established in 1902
Horse races in Kentucky